The 2012 IRB International Rugby Series was the first edition of a rugby union tournament, created by the International Rugby Board for tier two and tier three nations, played at Parc Eirias, Colwyn Bay in Wales. The matches between Canada, Russia, Samoa, Tonga and the United States were played over two match days on 9 November and 17 November 2012.

The aim of the tournament was to increase the competitiveness between emerging rugby nations before the 2015 Rugby World Cup, to be held in England and Wales. Other unions involved in the 2012 International Rugby Series were Chile, Fiji, Georgia, Japan, Portugal, Romania and Uruguay.

The tournament matches were in addition to those between tier one and tier two/three nations within the 2012-2019 international tours and test schedule which increased the opportunities for emerging rugby nations to play the world's best teams in June and November.

Fixtures

Sponsorship
The competition is funded by the International Rugby Board and supported by the Welsh Rugby Union (WRU) and Conwy County Borough Council.

See also
List of international rugby union teams
IRB International Rugby Series

References

2012 rugby union tournaments for national teams
2012–13 in Welsh rugby union
2012 in American rugby union
2012 in Canadian rugby union
2012 in Russian rugby union
2012 in Samoan rugby union
2012 in Tongan rugby union
International rugby union competitions hosted by Wales